Juphoon System Software is an international company which provides IP multimedia subsystem (IMS) solutions and services. The core team was established in Shenzhen, China in 2004, and it was officially established in Ningbo, China in 2005. Juphoon System Software has done long-term research in the field of IMS applications and voice over IP (VoIP) products. They are trying to introduce the high-quality commercial Session Initiation Protocol (SIP) Stack and other protocols (HTTP, XML, Sigcomp) to international communication enterprises.

Juphoon System Software makes the source code of IP phone online available for people to test and learn from. They also provide reference phones so that developers can run tests on a hardware phone.

In 2010, Juphoon System Software provided an IMS multimedia telephony (MMTel) and Rich Communication Suite solution. In 2011, Juphoon provided a Rich Communication Suite solution-enhanced (RCS-e) solution. In 2012, Juphoon provided a professional Voice and Video engine solution.

Juphoon System Software can provide softphone SDK on PC (Windows, Mac, Linux ) and mobile (iOS, Android, Symbian and Brew) systems.

Juphoon said that combining Social Network Service with mobile softphone is an important trend in RCS. It is reported that Juphoon will release an Android PoC Client and iPhone PoC client in 2011. Juphoon has cooperation with Azetti; Juphoon can provide a customer PoC client and Azetti can provide PoC server.

References

Companies based in Zhejiang
Software companies of China
Chinese brands